A Höhere Technische Lehranstalt (German for Higher Technical Education Institute, or in a transferred sense Technical College), commonly known as HTL, is an engineering-focused secondary school in Austria. As an umbrella term it is used for either
 Höhere Technische Lehranstalt (HTL, HTLA),
 Höhere Technische Bundeslehranstalt (HTBLA, HTBL, Federal Higher Technical Institute), or
 Höhere Technische Bundeslehr- und Versuchsanstalt (HTBLuVA, Federal Higher Technical Institute for Education and Experimentation).

These institutions are an important part of Austrian vocational education. HTLs specialise in disciplines such as civil engineering, electronics, electrical engineering, information technology, informatics, industrial engineering, mechanical engineering, mechatronics and chemistry. There are 75 HTLs in Austria (as of 2016).

HTLs also existed in Switzerland until 1995 when these institutions were converted into Swiss Universities of Applied Sciences.

Types of Courses
Höhere Technische Lehranstalten generally offer four different types of courses:

 Höhere Abteilung (ISCED level 5) offers the most common type of courses at Austrian HTLs. The courses last five years and start with grade 9. After five years, students may complete the curriculum with a Diplomarbeit, a final graded project that requires several hundred hours of work. After that, a student has to pass a comprehensive examination: one written test in mathematics, an exam in a main technical subject, at least one in a language (German or English) and the final oral examinations. This is called Reife- und Diplomprüfung since the Austrian Reifeprüfung (Matura) is an integral part of it and graduates are formally enabled to attend university. This type of education has a number of similarities to Japanese colleges of technology (Kōsen). After three years of work experience in engineering, graduates can apply for the Austrian professional title Ingenieur (pre-nominal letters: Ing.), literally engineer. 
 Fachschule (ISCED level 3) courses last four years and start with grade 9. After four years, students have to complete a Technikerarbeit (a final examination project) and then pass the final examinations to graduate from HTL. Students can also attend the examinations for the Berufsreifeprüfung, but these examinations are voluntary. The Berufsreifeprüfung formally enables students to attend university.
 The so-called Abendschule (evening school) offers a type of course that is very similar to the Höhere Abteilung and intended for people who want to study while they work. These courses are organized in 8 semesters and are completed with a Reife- und Diplomprüfung just like the Höhere Abteilung.
 The fourth type of courses at HTLs are special post-secondary courses for students who have completed an apprenticeship, are master craftsmen or graduated from Gymnasium with Matura. These types of courses are also offered at the Höhere Abteilungen and end with the same qualifications as the five-year courses.

HTLs
 The largest HTL in Austria with 3.500 students is the HTBLuVA Mödling, which is also the largest school in Europe.
 The oldest Austrian vocational school is the HTBLuVA Wien 5 Spengergasse in Vienna, established in 1758 by Maria Theresia.
 The HTBLVA TGM (Technologisches Gewerbe Museum) in Vienna has the highest school building in Austria (about 70m, 16 floors).
 The HTBLVA TGM also has the largest base area of any HTL in Austria.

Höhere Technische Lehranstalten in Austria

Sorting by Gemeindekennziffer.

See also
Education in Austria
List of universities in Austria

External links
www.bildungssystem.at - Information about the Austrian educational system

Engineering education
Vocational education in Austria
School types
Vocational education in Switzerland